van Osta is a surname. Notable people with the surname include:

Jean d'Osta (born Jean Van Osta, 1909–1993), Belgian writer, journalist, and humorist
Ward van Osta, Belgian historian and etymologist

Surnames of Dutch origin